More Stories From Inside Quebec was a Canadian documentary television series which aired on CBC Television in 1967.

Premise
This series of documentaries presented Quebec culture for English-Canadian audiences. Episodes featured people and topics such as Brother Andre of Saint Joseph's Oratory, federal politician Jean Marchand, Quebec Liberal Party president Eric Kierans, and women from rural Quebec communities who developed their careers in Montreal.

Scheduling
This half-hour series was broadcast on Tuesdays at 10:30 p.m. (Eastern) from 11 July to 29 August 1967.

References

External links
 

CBC Television original programming
1967 Canadian television series debuts
1967 Canadian television series endings